Mehr Alikhani (also Romanized as Mehr ‘Alīkhānī and Mīr ‘Alīkhānī; also known as Pīr ‘alī Khānī) is a village in Dehpir-e Shomali Rural District, in the Central District of Khorramabad County, Lorestan Province, Iran. At the 2006 census, its population was 116, in 22 families.

References 

Towns and villages in Khorramabad County